Puthuppariyaram is a suburb of Palakkad city in Palakkad District of Kerala,India. Puthuppariyaram lies on National Highway 966 and is located about 5 km from district headquarters and 124 km from Kozhikode. Puthuppariyaram Panchayat is one among the Panchayat which is supposed to be part of proposed Palakkad Municipal Corporation.

Demographics
 India census, Puthuppariyaram had a population of 51185 with a density of 1731.56 km^2 over an area of 29.56 Sq.Km.

References

Villages in Palakkad district
 
Suburbs of Palakkad
Cities and towns in Palakkad district